The Marriage of a Young Stockbroker is a 1971 American romantic comedy-drama film produced and directed by Lawrence Turman (in his directorial debut) and written by Lorenzo Semple Jr., based on a novel of the same title by Charles Webb. Turman had produced 1967's high-grossing hit The Graduate, also adapted from a book by Webb.

It stars Richard Benjamin in the title role and Joanna Shimkus as his beleaguered wife, with Adam West, Elizabeth Ashley, Patricia Barry, and Tiffany Bolling in supporting roles.

Plot
The story mainly deals with the crumbling marriage of William Alren and his wife Lisa, and how William uses voyeurism and extra-marital affairs to "spice up" his marriage. William gives up his career as a stockbroker, and takes up voyeurism full-time.

After putting up with her husband's various dalliances, Lisa is advised by her outspoken sister Nan to get a divorce. Nan's own marriage to Chester is in no better shape than Lisa's and equally on the rocks. The film ends with William and Lisa reunited, but not before Lisa finally gets "revenge" on her husband.

Cast
 Richard Benjamin as William Alren
 Joanna Shimkus as  Lisa
 Adam West as Chester
 Elizabeth Ashley as Nan 
 Patricia Barry as Dr. Sadler
 Tiffany Bolling as Train Girl

Critical reception
Critic Leonard Maltin felt that while the film was a "humorous and sad depiction of marital breakdown", the cast was let down by a script that  "seems uncertain as to what point it wants to drive across" (Maltin, 1991: 769). Steven Scheuer concurred somewhat, saying that while the film was "occasionally amusing" it also tended to be "generally heavy-handed" (Scheuer, 1990: 672).

Roger Greenspun generally found the picture to be miscast, especially Richard Benjamin, feeling that while he is "a good comedian [he is] miscast [in this role]" (Greenspun, 1971). He also thought it closer to an "unsuccessful television pilot" than a movie, in terms of its treatment of themes such as "sexual mechanics, the mechanics of marital supremacy, [and] the nuclear family as a machine for getting on in the suburbs" (Greenspun, 1971). Leslie Halliwell called it a "sardonic adult comedy of the battle of the sexes" (Halliwell, 2000: 522).

See also
 List of American films of 1971

References
Greenspun, Roger (1971) "The Marriage of a Young Stockbroker" The New York Times, August 20, 1971. (accessed 6 April 2008). 
Halliwell, Leslie (2000) Walker, John (ed.) Halliwell's Film & Video Guide 2001, HarperCollinsEntertainment, London.
Maltin, Leonard (1991) Leonard Maltin's Movie and Video Guide 1992, Signet, New York.
Scheuer, Steven H. (1990) Movies on TV and Videocassette, Bamtam Books, New York.

Notes

External links

1971 films
1971 comedy films
1971 directorial debut films
1971 drama films
1970s American films
1970s English-language films
1970s romantic comedy-drama films
1970s sex comedy films
20th Century Fox films
American romantic comedy-drama films
American sex comedy films
Films about adultery in the United States
Films based on American novels
Films scored by Fred Karlin
Films set in California